Manchester is a village in southeast Scott County, Illinois, United States. As of the 2000 census, the village population was 354. It is part of the Jacksonville Micropolitan Statistical Area.

Geography
Manchester is located at  (39.541840, -90.329390).

Demographics

As of the census of 2000, there were 354 people, 136 households, and 99 families residing in the village. The racial makeup of the village was 100.00% White.

There were 136 households, out of which 33.1% had children under the age of 18 living with them, 64.7% were married couples living together, 5.1% had a female householder with no husband present, and 27.2% were non-families. 22.1% of all households were made up of individuals, and 11.8% had someone living alone who was 65 years of age or older. The average household size was 2.60 and the average family size was 3.05.

In the village, the population was spread out, with 24.6% under the age of 18, 10.2% from 18 to 24, 28.5% from 25 to 44, 21.2% from 45 to 64, and 15.5% who were 65 years of age or older. The median age was 35 years. For every 100 females, there were 102.3 males. For every 100 females age 18 and over, there were 99.3 males.

The median income for a household in the village was $31,875, and the median income for a family was $37,500. Males had a median income of $26,964 versus $21,528 for females. The per capita income for the village was $13,728. About 8.7% of families and 10.7% of the population were below the poverty line, including 17.8% of those under age 18 and 3.6% of those age 65 or over.

History

The Village re-established the village fire department in the summer of 1997. The department grew exponentially until 2009 when Mayor Ron Drake took over as Fire Chief and bankrupted the department. The Village still has two of the fire trucks, but has no members who know how to operate them or is licensed to drive them, including Mayor Drake.

2013 mass murder
On April 24, 2013, a shooting left six people dead (including one unborn child) and another injured. The suspect Ricky Smith, a nephew of the village's mayor, Ron Drake, was killed in a gunfight with police.

References

Villages in Scott County, Illinois
Villages in Illinois
Jacksonville, Illinois micropolitan area